Five Israeli heavy battle tanks and four Armoured personnel carrier's (APC's) were destroyed in the Second Intifada, in the Gaza strip. Five of the armored vehicles were destroyed by remote-controlled mines and four by rocket-propelled grenades (RPG). Two Israeli officers and 22 other Israeli soldiers were killed in the attacks, one was abducted and at least nine wounded. One of the Merkava III and the two APC's that were destroyed by RPG fire hitting the ‘soft spot’ of the rear exit door.

The first Israeli tank to be destroyed in the Second Intifada was February 14, 2002 on the Karni-Netzarim road in the Israeli-occupied Gaza strip. An escorted convoy of settlers were attacked by an explosive charge and small-arms fire but none were injured. A heavy Merkava III battle tank was sent as reinforcements. The tank went over a pre-positioned remote-controlled powerful mine, which totally destroyed the tank, killing three of the crewmen.

About a month later a second Merkava tank was blown up in similar fashion in the same area, leading to another three Israeli fatalities. The tank commander as well as two other soldiers were killed.

In September, 2002 a Merkava II tank was blown up by a mine near the Kissufim crossing leading to the death of one soldier and the wounding of three others. Apparently the tank commander was blown out the turret hatch but landed unharmed.

On February 15, 2003, a tank went over another roadside bomb near the settlement of Dugit, killing all its four crewmen. According to Palestinian sources the tank was a Merkava but according to Israeli sources the destroyed tank was a Magach 7, a rebuilt Patton tank.

In May 2004, two M113 APC:s were blown up while transporting explosives used for destroying Palestinian tunnels under the Palestinian-Egyptian border fence. On May 11, an APC went over a road-side bomb, killing its entire crew of six soldiers. The next day a second APC exploded after being hit by an RPG grenade. Three soldiers were wounded in the incident.

On June 25, 2006, seven Palestinian fighters belonging to Hamas, Popular Resistance Committees and Army of Islam entered Israeli territory near Rafah through a 400 meter long tunnel dug under the border fence. The Palestinians opened simultaneous fire on a Merkava tank, an empty APC and a watchtower. Both the tank and the APC were hit by RPG grenades in the rear exit hatch and were penetrated and destroyed. Two of the tank's crewmen were killed and a third was wounded. The fourth, tank gunner Cpl. Gilad Shalit, was lightly wounded and captured. Two of the Palestinian attackers were killed in the incident while the rest could return to the Gaza strip with their prisoner. Three soldiers in the watchtower were wounded in the incident.

Israeli fatalities
	
Feb 14, 2002 (Karni-Netzarim road)
 St.-Sgt. Ron Lavie, 20, of Katzrin
 St.-Sgt. Moshe Peled, 20, of Rehovot
 St.-Sgt. Asher Zaguri, 21, of Shlomi

Mar 14, 2002 (Karni-Netzarim road)
 Sgt. Rotem Shani, 19, of Hod Hasharon 
 St.-Sgt. Matan Biderman, 21, of Carmiel
 St.-Sgt. Ala Hubeishi, 21, of Julis
(Two soldiers were injured)
	
Sept 5, 2002 (Kissufim Crossing)
 Sgt. Aviad Dotan, 21, of Moshav Nir Galim
(Three soldiers were wounded)
	
Feb 15, 2003 (Dugit)
 Sgt. Tal Alexei Belitzky, 21, of Rishon Lezion
 Sgt. Itay Mizrahi, 20, of Be'er Sheva
 St.-Sgt. Doron Cohen, 21, of Rishon Lezion
 Cpl. Noam Bahagon, 20, of Elkana
	
	
May 11, 2004 (Rafah)
 Sgt. Adaron Amar, 20,  of Eilat
 Sgt. Aviad Deri, 21, of Maale Adumim
 Sgt. Kobi Mizrahi, 20, of Moshav Mata
 Staff-Sgt. Ofer Jerbi, 21, of Moshav Ben-Zakai
 Staff-Sgt. Ya'akov (Zelco) Marviza, 25, of Kibbutz Hama'apil
 Staff-Sgt. Eitan Newman, 21, of Jerusalem
	
May 12, 2004
 Capt. Aviv Hakani, 23, of Ashdod
 Sgt.-Maj. Aiman Ghadir, 24, of Bir Makhsur
 Sgt. Za'ur (Zohar) Smelev, 19, of Ofakim
 Sgt. Lior Vishinski, 20, of Ramat Gan
 Cpl. Elad Cohen, 20, of Jerusalem
	
June 25, 2006 (Between the Kerem Shalom and Sufa crossings)
 Lt. Hanan Barak, 20, of Arad
 Staff-Sgt. Pavel Slutzker, 20, of Dimona
(Tank gunner Cpl. Gilad Shalit was abducted, and four others were wounded)

References

Attacks in the State of Palestine
Israeli–Palestinian conflict